Visual inspection is a common method of quality control, data acquisition, and data analysis.
Visual Inspection, used in maintenance of facilities, mean inspection of equipment and structures using either or all of raw human senses such as vision, hearing, touch and smell and/or any non-specialized inspection equipment.
Inspections requiring Ultrasonic, X-Ray equipment, Infra-red, etc. are not typically regarded as visual inspection as these Inspection methodologies require specialized equipment, training and certification.

Quality control
A study of the visual inspection of small integrated circuits found that the modal duration of eye fixations of trained inspectors was about 200 ms. The most accurate inspectors made the fewest eye fixations and were the fastest. When the same chip was judged more than once by an individual inspector the consistency of judgment was very high whereas the consistency between inspectors was somewhat less. Variation by a factor of six in inspection speed led to variation of less than a factor of two in inspection accuracy. Visual inspection had a false positive rate of 2% and a false negative rate of 23%.

Humorous terminology
To do an eyeball search is to look for something specific in a mass of code or data with one's own eyes, as opposed to using some sort of pattern matching software like grep or any other automated search tool. Also known as vgrep or ogrep, i.e., "visual/optical grep", and in the IBM mainframe world as IEBIBALL. The most important application of eyeball search / vgrep in software engineering is vdiff.

In various disciplines it is also called the "eyeball technique" or "eyeball method" (of data assessment).

"Eyeballing" is the most common and readily available method of initial data assessment.

Experts in pattern recognition maintain that the "eyeball" technique is still the most effective procedure for searching arbitrary, possibly unknown structures in data.

In the military, applying this sort of search to real-world terrain is often referred to as "using the Mark I Eyeball"  device (pronounced as Mark One Eyeball), the U.S. military adopting it in 1950s. The term is an allusion on military nomenclature, "Mark I" being the first version of a military vehicle or weapon.

See also
Automated optical inspection
Inspection
Inspection (medicine)
Statistical graphics
Visual search
Visual comparison

References

Quality control
Data analysis
Vision
Computer humor
Computer jargon
Military humor
Nondestructive testing